Elly M. Peterson (June 5, 1914 – June 9, 2008), was an American politician from Charlotte, Eaton County, Michigan.

Peterson was an overseas Red Cross volunteer in World War II. She was an officer in the American Cancer Society, an active member of the Congregational Church, American Legion Auxiliary, a lifetime member of the NAACP.

Early life 
On June 5, 1914, Peterson was born as Ella Maude McMillan in New Berlin, Illinois.

Education 
Peterson graduated from what is now William Woods University in Fulton, Missouri.

Career
Peterson was vice chairwoman of the Michigan Republican Party from 1961 to 1963 and a candidate for U.S. Senator from Michigan in 1964. Asked to run by Governor George W. Romney, Peterson would later comment that she picked up the gauntlet and ran for the Senate because no one else would run against the popular incumbent, Philip Hart, particularly in a year with her party divided over its presidential candidate, Barry Goldwater. Winning just 35.3 percent of the vote, she nevertheless bettered Goldwater's tally in Michigan—33.1 percent—and did so with little funds; to accomplish that much was a tribute to her energy, organization and down-to-earth appeal.

In 1965, Peterson became the first woman to serve as chair of the Michigan Republican Party. In 1965, Peterson was also the first woman in U.S. history to chair a Republican state central committee, until 1969.
The Michigan Political History Society eventually selected Elly Peterson as the best Republican state chairwoman in the last fifty years. She was assistant to the chair of the Republican National Committee from 1969-71.

In 1979, the Supersisters trading card set was produced and distributed; one of the cards featured Peterson's name and picture.

Eventually, Peterson became an Independent.

Political positions
She worked to elect Romney as governor and his lieutenant governor, William Milliken, who succeeded him when Romney became joined the cabinet of President Richard Nixon as the secretary of Housing and Urban Development in 1969.

At the Republican National Committee, Peterson was a strong advocate for outreach, empowerment, fence-mending and organization. She continued the practices that had made her effective as chairwoman of the Michigan Republican Party. Inquisitive and probing, she was also quick to laugh and often referred to as "mother" by her interns, such as Christine Todd Whitman.  Friendly and un-dogmatic, while in Washington she shared a house with the prominent Democrat Liz Carpenter, who'd been press secretary for Lady Bird Johnson and a speech-writer for Vice President Lyndon Johnson.

An egalitarian by philosophy and example, Peterson was a national co-chairwoman of ERAmerica, a private national campaign organization, during the fight to get the Equal Rights Amendment ratified. Peterson also strongly supported abortion rights and was a charter member in the National Women's Political Caucus. At this time, in the early 1970s, the conservative wing of the Republican Party was beginning to create friction with the liberal members, Peterson amongst them.  She successfully battled to keep Phyllis Schlafly from seizing control of the National Federation of Republican Women, but she was experiencing reduced affinity with the Republican National Convention platform and by 1983 endorsed James Blanchard, the Democrat running for governor of Michigan, rather than the conservative Republican.

Awards 
 1984 Michigan Women's Hall of Fame

Personal life 
In 1935, Peterson married William M. Peterson. Peterson joined the American Red Cross and spent 22 months in England, France and Germany. After World War Ii, Peterson and her family moved to Charlotte, Michigan. They have no children.

In 1994, Peterson's husband died.

On June 9, 2008, Peterson died in Grand Junction, Colorado.

References

External links 
The Political Graveyard
2005 Boston Globe article
https://web.archive.org/web/20071008181758/http://www.minutemanmedia.org/MIM%20060904.htm
https://web.archive.org/web/20071008181838/http://www.minutemanmedia.org/MIM%20032404.htm
 New book celebrates Michigan political leader Elly Peterson: 'Mother' of the Moderates (2011)

|-

1914 births
2008 deaths
Michigan Independents
Michigan Republican Party chairs
Michigan Republicans
People from Charlotte, Michigan
William Woods University alumni
Women in Michigan politics
20th-century American women
20th-century American people
21st-century American women